The 1902 Copa de la Coronación was a football competition in honour of the coronation of Alfonso XIII of Spain. The Royal Spanish Football Federation does not recognize it as the first season of the Copa del Rey, which began the following year.

The competition was thought up after Carlos Padrós, later president of Madrid FC, suggested a football competition to celebrate the coronation of Alfonso XIII. Four other teams joined Madrid for the first competition: FC Barcelona, Club Español de Foot-Ball, Bizcaya (a combination of Athletic Club and Bilbao Football Club) and New Foot-Ball Club. The competition featured the first recorded game between Barcelona and Madrid FC, with the former emerging as 3–1 winners, courtesy of goals from Udo Steinberg and Joan Gamper.

Carlos Padrós was also the referee of the final, held at the Hipódromo in Madrid, in which Bizcaya lifted the trophy after beating Barcelona 2–1.

Quarterfinals

Semifinals

Final

Note: Some sources list Udo Steinberg as the goalscorer of Barcelona's consolation goal.

Consolation Trophy / Copa de la Gran Peña

Originally, this was to feature the four clubs aside from Copa de la Coronación winners Bizcaya in a knockout tournament.

However, New Foot-Ball Club had returned home after their crushing defeat to Bizaya in the Copa de la Coronación, while FC Barcelona were forced to withdraw as their players had to return to their occupations, leaving them unable to field a team.

Therefore, the Gran Peña Cup was played as a single match between Madrid FC and Club Español.

Statistics

Goalscorers

Legacy
The Copa de la Coronación was the first national football tournament played in Spain, being organized as a punctual commemorative celebration. However, its success led to the organization of the first edition of the Copa del Rey the following year, then known as the Spanish Championship. Since then, it has been held on an annual basis. Due to this fact, the Copa de la Coronación is generally considered informally as the first edition of the Copa del Rey, although the Royal Spanish Football Federation does not recognize it as such.

References

1902
1902 domestic association football cups
1901–02 in Spanish football
Alfonso XIII of Spain
History of football in Spain
Defunct football competitions in Spain